Spodnja Kanomlja is a settlement immediately west of Spodnja Idrija in the Municipality of Idrija in the traditional Inner Carniola region of Slovenia. It lies in the valley of Kanomljica Creek, a small tributary of the Idrijca River.

References

External links
Spodnja Kanomlja on Geopedia

Populated places in the Municipality of Idrija